Kuzdagan (also Romanized as Kūzdagan; also known as Gezdagian, Goz Dagan, and Gūzdakan) is a village in Bastam Rural District, in the Central District of Chaypareh County, West Azerbaijan Province, Iran. At the 2006 census, its population was 61, in 15 families.

References  
 
 
 
 
 

Populated places in Chaypareh County